The 15th Karnataka Legislative Assembly was constituted after the Karnataka Legislative Assembly elections in 2018. Polling was held on 12 May for 222 constituencies out of the 224-member assembly, with counting of votes and results declared on 15 May. The term of the assembly is for five years.

Council of Ministers

Members

Sources: Election Commission of India, Times of India, News 18, News Minute

Governor

Speaker

Deputy Speaker

Leader of the House (Chief Minister)

Deputy Leader of the House (Deputy Chief Minister)

Leader of the Opposition

References 

 

 
Karnataka Legislative Assembly
Karnataka MLAs 2018–2023
2018 establishments in Karnataka
Karnataka